The first season of the One Piece anime series was produced by Toei Animation, and directed by Kounosuke Uda. The season is adapted from the first twelve volumes of the manga by Eiichiro Oda and aired on Fuji Television from October 20, 1999 through March 14, 2001, totaling 61 episodes. The first season depicts the exploits of the pirate captain Monkey D. Luffy and as he gathers his crew and heads to the Grand Line in search of the titular treasure, the "One Piece".

In 2004, 4Kids Entertainment licensed the series for a heavily edited English dubbed broadcast. 4Kids edited the episodes for content, merged one episode and left out 18 episodes, thus reducing the season's episode count to a total of 44 episodes. The series made its U.S. premiere on September 18, 2004 on Fox as part of its FoxBox TV programming block, lasting until July 30, 2005. Funimation Entertainment later licensed the series and released the first season in four unedited and uncut, bilingual-language compilations; the first was released on May 27, 2008 and the last was released on March 31, 2009.

The season uses four pieces of theme music: two opening themes and two ending themes. The first opening theme is the award-winning title , performed by Hiroshi Kitadani in Japanese and Vic Mignogna in English (Funimation dub; Russell Velazquez initially performed the English version for the 4Kids dub before replacing it with the "Pirate Rap") for the first 47 episodes. The second opening, which was used for the rest of the season, is "Believe" by Folder5 in Japanese and Meredith McCoy in English. The first ending theme, titled "Memories" for the first 30 episodes, and was performed by Maki Otsuki in Japanese and Brina Palencia in English, who also performed the second ending theme song, titled "Run! Run! Run!" in Japanese, for the rest of the season. Caitlin Glass performed the English version of the second ending theme. 4Kids used original music in their adaptation, while Funimation opted for English-language versions of the theme music pieces.

Episode list

Critical reception
The season's uncut home video release generally received positive reviews from critics due to its humor, fight sequences, characters and music. The Arlong Park storyline has been highlighted as the strongest of the season, although David Brook less favorably described these episodes as "melodramatic" for Blueprint Review. Commenting on the animation, several critics applauded the series' accuracy to the manga's art style, but noted that moments of limited animation betrayed the low budget of the series.

Both John Sinnott and Neil Lumbard rated the season "Highly Recommended" when writing for DVD Talk, with Lumbard describing Luffy as "easily one of the most endearing, comical, and fun characters in anime history". Writing for Anime News Network, Carl Kimlinger awarded the first 26 episodes "B" ratings, but found the "emotional core" of the Captain Buggy episodes to be underwhelming and commented that the early episodes of the series did not match the standard that would be set by later episodes. Writing for Starburst, Julian White claimed that the series was "likely to give you one helluva migraine" and awarded 6/10 to the first 26 episodes. IGN's David F. Smith awarded the first 13 episodes 7/10, also commenting on the slow pace of the episodes but conceding that "you might just call it a convention of the genre".

Nefarious Reviews rated the season "Medium" saying that "the early episodes don’t give a good first impression, but once the longer story begins, One Piece stretches it’s creativity to give a good opening season with promises of so much more adventure". David F. Smith writing for IGN gave the uncut home video release a 7/10 saying that "One Piece is a pretty good time. It's a colorful, funny, action-packed kids' adventure show, and Funimation's wrapped it up in a well-produced package at a price that can't be beat."

Home releases

Japanese

VHS

DVD

Blu-ray
The Eternal Log contains 16:9 versions of the episodes in standard definition Blu-ray format.

English

4Kids

Uncut 
In North America, the final episodes of this season were recategorized as the opening of "Season Two" for their DVD release by Funimation Entertainment. The Australian Season sets were renamed Collection 1 through 5.

Notes

References

1999 Japanese television seasons
2000 Japanese television seasons
2001 Japanese television seasons
One Piece seasons
One Piece episodes